Bernard Sterling Comrie,   (born 23 May 1947) is a British-born linguist. Comrie is a specialist in linguistic typology, linguistic universals and on Caucasian languages.

Early life and education
Comrie was born in Sunderland, England on 23 May 1947. He earned his undergraduate and doctoral degrees in  Modern and Medieval Languages and Linguistics from the University of Cambridge, where he also taught Russian and Linguistics until 
he moved to the Linguistics Department of the University of Southern California.

Academic career
For 17 years he was professor at and director of the former Department of Linguistics at the Max Planck Institute for Evolutionary Anthropology in Leipzig, Germany, combined with a post as Distinguished Professor of Linguistics at the University of California, Santa Barbara, where he returned full-time from 1 June 2015. He has also taught at the University of Southern California and the University of California, Los Angeles.

Personal life
He married linguistics professor Akiko Kumahira in 1985.

Honours
Comrie was elected a Fellow of the British Academy (FBA), the United Kingdom's national academy for the humanities and social sciences. He became a foreign member of the Royal Netherlands Academy of Arts and Sciences in 2000. In September 2017, he was awarded the Neil and Saras Smith Medal for Linguistics by the British Academy.

Selected works

Books
 The World's Major Languages (ed.), 1987, New York: Oxford University Press, . Second edition: 2009, Routledge .
 Tense, 1985, Cambridge University Press. .
 Language Universals and Linguistic Typology: Syntax and Morphology, 1981, The University of Chicago Press.
 Aspect: An Introduction to the Study of Verbal Aspect and Related Problems, 1976, Cambridge University Press.

Articles

 Comrie, Bernard. 1975. Causatives and universal grammar. Transactions of the Philological Society 1974. 1–32.
 Comrie, Bernard. 1976. The syntax of causative constructions: Cross-language similarities and divergences. In Shibatani, Masayoshi (ed.), Syntax and Semantics 6: The Grammar of Causative Constructions, 261–312. New York: Academic Press.
 Comrie, Bernard. 1978. Ergativity. In Lehmann, Winfred P. (ed.), Syntactic typology: Studies in the phenomenology of language, 329–394. Austin: University of Texas Press.
 Comrie, Bernard. 1986. Markedness, grammar, people, and the world. In Eckman, Fred R. & Moravcsik, Edith A. & Wirth, Jessica R. (eds.), Markedness, 85–106. New York: Plenum.
 Comrie, Bernard. 1999. Reference-tracking: Description and explanation. Sprachtypologie und Universalienforschung 52(3–4). 335–346.
 Comrie, Bernard. 2005. Alignment of case marking. In Haspelmath, Martin & Dryer, Matthew S. & Gil, David & Comrie, Bernard (eds.), The world atlas of language structures, 398–405. Oxford: Oxford University Press. ((http://wals.info/chapter/98))
 Keenan, Edward L. & Comrie, Bernard. 1977. Noun phrase accessibility and universal grammar. Linguistic Inquiry 8. 63–99.

References

External links
Homepage at the Max Planck Institute

1947 births
Living people
Linguists from the United Kingdom
University of California, Santa Barbara faculty
Alumni of the University of Cambridge
People from Sunderland
Members of the Royal Netherlands Academy of Arts and Sciences
Foreign Members of the Russian Academy of Sciences
Paleolinguists
Fellows of the Cognitive Science Society
Recipients of the Neil and Saras Smith Medal for Linguistics
Corresponding Fellows of the British Academy
Linguists of Papuan languages
Linguists of Piawi languages
Linguists of Caucasian languages
20th-century linguists
21st-century linguists
Max Planck Institute for Evolutionary Anthropology
Max Planck Institute directors
Fellows of the Linguistic Society of America